John C. Lifland (born July 13, 1933) is a former United States district judge of the United States District Court for the District of New Jersey.

Education and career

Born in Jersey City, New Jersey, Lifland received a Bachelor of Arts degree from Yale University in 1954 and a Bachelor of Laws from Harvard Law School in 1957. He was in private practice in Newark, New Jersey from 1957 to 1959. He was in the United States Army as a lieutenant in 1958. He was a legal secretary for Judge Thomas F. Meaney of the United States District Court for the District of New Jersey from 1959 to 1961. He was in private practice in Newark from 1961 to 1988.

Federal judicial service

On February 29, 1988, Lifland was nominated by President Ronald Reagan to a seat on the United States District Court for the District of New Jersey vacated by Judge Clarkson Sherman Fisher. He was confirmed by the United States Senate on May 19, 1988, and received his commission on May 20, 1988. He assumed senior status on June 15, 2001. Lifland served in that capacity until his retirement on May 31, 2007.

References

Sources

External links
 An oral history interview of Judge Lifland was conducted by the Historical Society for the U.S. District Court for the District of New Jersey on June 2, 2006.

1933 births
Living people
Harvard Law School alumni
Yale University alumni
Judges of the United States District Court for the District of New Jersey
United States district court judges appointed by Ronald Reagan
20th-century American judges
United States Army officers